No. 140 Wing RAF was a formation of the Royal Air Force during the Second World War. It comprised No. 21 Squadron RAF, No. 464 (RAAF) Squadron RAF and No. 487 (RNZAF) Squadron RAF. It carried out many notable low-level bombing operations, including Operation Jericho (Amiens prison) and Operation Carthage in Copenhagen.

No. 464 and No. 487 Squadrons were Article XV Squadrons, i.e.  they were Commonwealth squadrons which operated under the operational control of the Royal Air Force, which also was responsible e.g. for their pay.

References

Wings of the Royal Air Force in the Second World War